Chicago Root Beer is a brand of root beer primarily available in the United States. 

The formula for Chicago Root Beer dates back to the early days of prohibition. Chicago Root Beer is a caffeine free beverage and is manufactured in Chicago with pure cane sugar and water from local Lake Michigan. The Chicago skyline appears on the bottle's label.

The rights to the Chicago Root Beer brand are owned by Cool Mountain Beverages, Inc. Chicago Root Beer is distributed both regionally and nationally through franchisees across the U.S.

Chicago Root Beer is available in 12 oz. glass bottles, 5 gallon bag 'n box syrups and kegs.

Ingredients 

Chicago Root Beer is considered an artisan or craft root beer, with ingredients that include pure cane sugar, caramel and wintergreen.

References

External links 
 Chicago Root Beer's website
 Cool Mountain Gourmet Soda website

Root beer